Magna Mater is a Latin name for the Anatolian mother goddess Cybele.

Magna Mater may also refer to:
Isis, a goddess from the polytheistic pantheon of Egypt
Maia, one of the Pleiades, and the mother of Hermes in the ancient Greek religion
Rhea (mythology), a deity in Greek mythology

See also 
 Great Mother (disambiguation)